Central Grove is a community in the Canadian province of Nova Scotia, located in the Municipality of the District of Digby in  Digby County on Long Island.

References
 Central Grove on Destination Nova Scotia

Communities in Digby County, Nova Scotia
General Service Areas in Nova Scotia